Athen (meaning Athens in several languages, including German, Norwegian and Danish)
is the name of two German merchant ships:
 , German merchant ship lost off Portland Bill in the English Channel in 1906, and now a dive site
 , German merchant ship that survived the attack that sank  in 1945; afterwards registered in the USSR as General Brusilow and from 1947 in Poland as Waryński.

See also
 Athen family, a noble family of Sardinia during the 11th and 12th centuries
 Atena (disambiguation)
 Athena (disambiguation)
 Athene (disambiguation)
 Athens (disambiguation)

Ship names